Yevgeniya Nikolaevna Sidorova (later Kabina , 13 December 1930 – 29 January 2003) was a Soviet alpine skier who competed for the Soviet Union in the 1956 Winter Olympics,  in the 1960 Winter Olympics, and in the 1964 Winter Olympics.

She was born in Moscow. In 1956, she won the bronze medal in the slalom event. In the downhill competition she finished 37th and in the giant slalom contest she finished 40th.

Four years later she competed as Yevgeniya Kabina and finished 18th in the 1960 slalom event. In the same year she finished 20th downhill competition and 31st in the giant slalom contest.

At the 1964 Games she finished 27th in the slalom event, 37th downhill competition, and 38th in the giant slalom contest.

External links
 Yevgeniya Sidorova's profile at Sports Reference.com

1930 births
2003 deaths
Russian female alpine skiers
Soviet female alpine skiers
Olympic alpine skiers of the Soviet Union
Alpine skiers at the 1956 Winter Olympics
Alpine skiers at the 1960 Winter Olympics
Alpine skiers at the 1964 Winter Olympics
Olympic bronze medalists for the Soviet Union
Skiers from Moscow
Olympic medalists in alpine skiing
Medalists at the 1956 Winter Olympics